Shelina Permalloo is a TV Chef, Restaurateur and Cookery Author. Shelina was born in Southampton and identifies as being a British Mauritian with both parents migrating from Mauritius to the UK in the 1970's

After time as a project manager in the field of equality, diversity and inclusion, Shelina went on to take part in television’s popular MasterChef programme, being crowned BBC’s MasterChef Champion in 2012. She launched into TV and media as well as publishing her first cook book ‘Sunshine on a Plate’ showcasing her Mauritian heritage. She opened her first restaurant Lakaz Maman in Southampton in 2016, greeted with critical and popular acclaim as featured in the Telegraph in 2020

Her restaurant is inspired by modern Mauritian street food and is run by an all-female management team, which is rare in the field of hospitality. She continues to broadcast and write on food. Shelina regularly features on BBC Radio 4 The Kitchen Cabinet as a regular panellist alongside food critic Jay Rayner. She is as a regular judge on BBC’s MasterChef as well as featuring as a guest chef on TV in show's such as Saturday Kitchen, Kirstie Allsopp Handmade Christmas, John and Lisa's Weekend Kitchen. 

Her first book 'Sunshine on a Plate' reflects her Mauritian Heritage and won the Gourmand book awards for 'best African cookbook', her second book The Sunshine Diet was published in 2015 both published by Ebury Press. 

Most recently she has partnered her restaurant with SOS Children’s Village, an orphanage based in Mauritius. For every full-time staff member, Lakaz Maman will sponsor a child in order to directly impact and benefit vulnerable children in Mauritius.

Her community work in Southampton is extensive and was appointed Chair of Southampton 2025 City of Culture Trust. During the pandemic, Shelina and her team cooked over 1,500 meals for keyworkers, homeless, and children, as well as supporting over 300 free school meals. She is an ambassador for Southampton’s Holiday Activities and Food Programme.

Publications
 Sunshine on a Plate (2013)
 The Sunshine Diet (2015)

References

External links
Official site

*Ted Talk The Power of Food in Community

Living people
Mass media people from Southampton
English people of Mauritian descent
Reality cooking competition winners
Women chefs
Year of birth missing (living people)